Gary “Ryan” Mack (born November 13, 1979 in Birmingham, Michigan) is an American soccer midfielder who played for the Syracuse Silver Knights of the MISL.

Youth
Mack was the Michigan High School Player of the Year as a soccer player at Seaholm High School.  He attended Indiana University where he played on the men’s soccer team from 1998 to 2002.  In 1998 and 1999, the Hoosiers won the NCAA Men's Soccer Championship.  He was a 2000 third team All American, but missed the 2001 season with a torn anterior cruciate ligament, returning for a final season in 2002.

Professional
On January 17, 2003, the Chicago Fire selected Mack in the third round (25th overall) in the 2003 MLS SuperDraft.  In 2004, he played for the Syracuse Salty Dogs of the USL A-League.  Mack played for the San Diego Sockers during the 2004-2005 Major Indoor Soccer League season.  The Sockers folded mid-season.  He then played for the Virginia Beach Mariners during the 2006 USL-1 season.  On October 5, 2006, the expansion Detroit Ignition of Major Indoor Soccer League signed Mack for the team’s first season. The Ignition had selected Mack with the 12th pick in the 2006 MISL Expansion Draft.  He played for the Ignition until they folded in 2009.  That fall, Mack moved to the Milwaukee Wave where he spent two seasons.  In November 2011, he signed with the Detroit Waza of the Professional Arena Soccer League. In 2012, he returned to Syracuse and signed for the MISL side the Syracuse Silver Knights.

References

External links 
MISL Player Profile

1979 births
Living people
American soccer players
Detroit Ignition players
Detroit Waza players
Indiana Hoosiers men's soccer players
Soccer players from Michigan
Syracuse Salty Dogs players
Major Indoor Soccer League (2001–2008) players
Major Indoor Soccer League (2008–2014) players
Milwaukee Wave players
Professional Arena Soccer League players
USL First Division players
Virginia Beach Mariners players
Xtreme Soccer League players
A-League (1995–2004) players
Chicago Fire FC players
Chicago Fire FC draft picks
Association football midfielders
Syracuse Silver Knights players